The men's big air competition of the 2013 FIS Snowboarding World Championships was held in Stoneham-et-Tewkesbury, Québec, Canada on January 18 & 19, 2013. 37 athletes from 14 countries competed.

Medalists

Results

Qualification

Semifinal

Final

References

Results

Big air